The 2014 Ladbrokes World Darts Championship was the 21st World Championship organised by the Professional Darts Corporation since it separated from the British Darts Organisation. The event took place at the Alexandra Palace, London between 13 December 2013 and 1 January 2014.

Phil Taylor was the defending champion, having won his 16th title in 2013, but he lost 4–3 to Michael Smith in the second round.

Terry Jenkins and Kyle Anderson recorded both televised nine-dart finishes during the event, in their first-round matches against Per Laursen and Ian White, respectively.

Michael van Gerwen won his first World Championship by defeating Peter Wright 7–4 in the final. He became the sixth winner of the event and, at the age of 24, the youngest.
The result also saw him replace Taylor as the new world number one.
A new record of 603 maximum 180 scores were made during the championship, beating the previous best of 588 set in 2012. For the first time in PDC history, there was no Englishman in the final.

Format and qualifiers
The televised stages featured 72 players. The top 32 players in the PDC Order of Merit on 26 November 2013 were seeded for the tournament. They were joined by the 16 highest non-qualified players from the Pro Tour Order of Merit, based on the events played on the 2013 PDC Pro Tour.

These 48 players were joined by two PDPA qualifiers (as determined at the PDPA Qualifying event held in Barnsley on 25 November 2013), the highest ranked non-qualified player on the PDC Challenge Tour Order of Merit, and 21 international players: the four highest names in the European Order of Merit not already qualified, and 17 further international qualifiers to be determined by the PDC and PDPA.

Some of the international players, such as the four from the European Order of Merit, and the top American and Australian players were entered straight into the first round, while others, having won qualifying events in their countries, were entered into the preliminary round.

Order of Merit

Pro Tour
  Stuart Kellett
  Jelle Klaasen
  Jamie Lewis
  Darren Webster
  Ronny Huybrechts
  Joe Cullen
  Arron Monk
  Mensur Suljović
  John Henderson
  Dennis Smith
  Ricky Evans
  Kevin McDine
  Dean Winstanley
  Ross Smith
  Mark Dudbridge
  Steve Brown

European Order of MeritFirst Round Qualifiers
  Max Hopp
  Mareno Michels
  Jarkko Komula
  Tomas Seyler

PDPA QualifierFirst Round Qualifier
  Matt Clark

Preliminary Round Qualifier
  Ian Moss

Challenge Tour QualifierPreliminary Round Qualifier
  Ben Ward

International QualifiersFirst Round Qualifiers
  Darin Young
  Beau Anderson
  Kyle Anderson
Preliminary Round Qualifiers
  Julio Barbero
  Morihiro Hashimoto
  Royden Lam
  Mohd Latif Sapup
  Per Laursen
  Zoran Lerchbacher
  Paul Lim
  Dennis Lindskjold
  Colin McGarry
  Devon Petersen
  Edward Santos
  Rob Szabo
  Gino Vos
  Andree Welge
  Colin Osborne

Edward Santos withdrew due to travel problems and was replaced by Colin Osborne, the highest-ranking non-qualified player on the PDC Order of Merit.

Prize money
The 2014 World Championship features a prize fund of at least £1,050,000. The winner's prize money has been increased from £200,000 to £250,000.

The prize money is allocated as follows:

Bracket
The preliminary round was drawn on 30 November, the last 64 draw took place on 2 December 2013 and was made by Rod Harrington and Wayne Mardle. It was shown live on Sky Sports.

Preliminary round
The preliminary round was played in a first to four legs format. One match was played per session with the winners playing their first round matches later on the same day.

Last 64

Final

Statistics
{|class="wikitable sortable" style="font-size: 95%; text-align: right"
|-
! Player
! Eliminated
! Played
! Sets Won
! Sets Lost
! Legs Won
! Legs Lost
! 100+
! 140+
! 180s
! High checkout
! Average
|-
|align="left"|  Michael van Gerwen
|  Winner
| 6
| 
| 
| 
| 
| 
| 
| 
| 154
| 98.03
|-
|align="left"|  Peter Wright
|  Runner-up
| 6
| 
| 
| 
| 
| 
| 
| 
| 164
| 98.93
|-
|align="left"|  Adrian Lewis
|  Semi-finals
| 5
| 
| 
| 
| 
| 
| 
| 
| 158
| 97.17
|-
|align="left"|  Simon Whitlock
|  Semi-finals
| 5
| 
| 
| 
| 
| 
| 
| 
| 136
| 95.73
|-
|align="left"|  Ian White
|  Quarter-finals
| 4
| 
| 
| 
| 
| 
| 
| 
| 128
| 97.44
|-
|align="left"|  James Wade
|  Quarter-finals
| 4
| 
| 
| 
| 
| 
| 
| 
| 142
| 93.64
|-
|align="left"|  Wes Newton
|  Quarter-finals
| 4
| 
| 
| 
| 
| 
| 
| 
| 170
| 92.13
|-
|align="left"|  Mark Webster
|  Quarter-finals
| 4
| 
| 
| 
| 
| 
| 
| 
| 157
| 91.19
|-
|align="left"|  Gary Anderson
|  Third round
| 3
| 
| 
| 
| 
| 
| 
| 
| 119
| 98.00
|-
|align="left"|  Raymond van Barneveld
|  Third round
| 3
| 
| 
| 
| 
| 
| 
| 
| 141
| 97.68
|-
|align="left"|  Richie Burnett
|  Third round
| 3
| 
| 
| 
| 
| 
| 
| 
| 96
| 96.31
|-
|align="left"|  Robert Thornton
|  Third round
| 3
| 
| 
| 
| 
| 
| 
| 
| 136
| 92.50
|-
|align="left"|  Kevin Painter
|  Third round
| 3
| 
| 
| 
| 
| 
| 
| 
| 116
| 92.19
|-
|align="left"|  Mervyn King
|  Third round
| 3
| 
| 
| 
| 
| 
| 
| 
| 136
| 92.18
|-
|align="left"|  Michael Smith
|  Third round
| 3
| 
| 
| 
| 
| 
| 
| 
| 141
| 90.86
|-
|align="left"|  Devon Petersen
|  Third round
| 4
| 
| 
| 
| 
| 
| 
| 
| 141
| 90.32
|-
|align="left"|  Phil Taylor
|  Second round
| 2
| 
| 
| 
| 
| 
| 
| 
| 156
| 96.12
|-
|align="left"|  Paul Nicholson
|  Second round
| 2
| 
| 
| 
| 
| 
| 
| 
| 136
| 95.21
|-
|align="left"|  Andy Hamilton
|  Second round
| 2
| 
| 
| 
| 
| 
| 
| 
| 124
| 94.46
|-
|align="left"|  Kim Huybrechts
|  Second round
| 2
| 
| 
| 
| 
| 
| 
| 
| 111
| 93.51
|-
|align="left"|  Brendan Dolan
|  Second round
| 2
| 
| 
| 
| 
| 
| 
| 
| 167
| 93.41
|-
|align="left"|  Vincent van der Voort
|  Second round
| 2
| 
| 
| 
| 
| 
| 
| 
| 131
| 92.72
|-
|align="left"|  John Henderson
|  Second round
| 2
| 
| 
| 
| 
| 
| 
| 
| 132
| 91.62
|-
|align="left"|  Jamie Caven
|  Second round
| 2
| 
| 
| 
| 
| 
| 
| 
| 158
| 91.54
|-
|align="left"|  Kevin McDine
|  Second round
| 2
| 
| 
| 
| 
| 
| 
| 
| 81
| 90.96
|-
|align="left"|  Ricky Evans
|  Second round
| 2
| 
| 
| 
| 
| 
| 
| 
| 138
| 90.81
|-
|align="left"|  Justin Pipe
|  Second round
| 2
| 
| 
| 
| 
| 
| 
| 
| 110
| 90.43
|-
|align="left"|  Per Laursen
|  Second round
| 3
| 
| 
| 
| 
| 
| 
| 
| 128
| 89.54
|-
|align="left"|  Andy Smith
|  Second round
| 2
| 
| 
| 
| 
| 
| 
| 
| 161
| 87.14
|-
|align="left"|  Jarkko Komula
|  Second round
| 2
| 
| 
| 
| 
| 
| 
| 
| 126
| 86.78
|-
|align="left"|  Beau Anderson
|  Second round
| 2
| 
| 
| 
| 
| 
| 
| 
| 76
| 85.71
|-
|align="left"|  John Part
|  Second round
| 2
| 
| 
| 
| 
| 
| 
| 
| 76
| 85.19
|-
|align="left"|  Dave Chisnall
|  First round
| 1
| 
| 
| 
| 
| 
| 
| 
| 121
| 98.43
|-
|align="left"|  Terry Jenkins
|  First round
| 1
| 
| 
| 
| 
| 
| 
| 
| 170
| 95.91
|-
|align="left"|  Dean Winstanley
|  First round
| 1
| 
| 
| 
| 
| 
| 
| 
| 60
| 95.48
|-
|align="left"|  Stuart Kellett
|  First round
| 1
| 
| 
| 
| 
| 
| 
| 
| 84
| 95.09
|-
|align="left"|  Jamie Lewis
|  First round
| 1
| 
| 
| 
| 
| 
| 
| 
| 84
| 91.02
|-
|align="left"|  Joe Cullen
|  First round
| 1
| 
| 
| 
| 
| 
| 
| 
| 147
| 90.83
|-
|align="left"|  Mark Dudbridge
| First round
| 1
| 
| 
| 
| 
| 
| 
| 
| 41
| 90.40
|-
|align="left"|  Darren Webster
|  First round
| 1
| 
| 
| 
| 
| 
| 
| 
| 81
| 90.12
|-
|align="left"|  Ronny Huybrechts
|  First round
| 1
| 
| 
| 
| 
| 
| 
| 
| 97
| 90.10
|-
|align="left"|  Zoran Lerchbacher
|  First round
| 2
| 
| 
| 
| 
| 
| 
| 
| 138
| 90.10
|-
|align="left"|  Wayne Jones
|  First round
| 1
| 
| 
| 
| 
| 
| 
| 
| 120
| 89.75
|-
|align="left"|  Kyle Anderson
|  First round
| 1
| 
| 
| 
| 
| 
| 
| 
| 141
| 89.68
|-
|align="left"|  Jelle Klaasen
|  First round
| 1
| 
| 
| 
| 
| 
| 
| 
| 36
| 89.56
|-
|align="left"|  Julio Barbero
| First round
| 2
| 
| 
| 
| 
| 
| 
| 
| 80
| 88.78
|-
|align="left"|  Steve Beaton
|  First round
| 1
| 
| 
| 
| 
| 
| 
| 
| 106
| 87.76
|-
|align="left"|  Tomas Seyler
|  First round
| 1
| 
| 
| 
| 
| 
| 
| 
| 56
| 86.98
|-
|align="left"|  Ronnie Baxter
|  First round
| 1
| 
| 
| 
| 
| 
| 
| 
| 40
| 86.60
|-
|align="left"|  Mark Walsh
|  First round
| 1
| 
| 
| 
| 
| 
| 
| 
| 121
| 86.51
|-
|align="left"|  Colin Osborne
|  First round
| 2
| 
| 
| 
| 
| 
| 
| 
| 122
| 86.23
|-
|align="left"|  Ross Smith
|  First round
| 1
| 
| 
| 
| 
| 
| 
| 
| 107
| 86.20
|-
|align="left"|  Steve Brown
|  First round
| 1
| 
| 
| 
| 
| 
| 
| 
| 56
| 84.89
|-
|align="left"|  Mensur Suljović
|  First round
| 1
| 
| 
| 
| 
| 
| 
| 
| 130
| 84.02
|-
|align="left"|  Colin Lloyd
|  First round
| 1
| 
| 
| 
| 
| 
| 
| 
| 112
| 83.62
|-
|align="left"|  Rob Szabo
| First round
| 2
| 
| 
| 
| 
| 
| 
| 
| 128
| 83.42
|-
|align="left"|  Darin Young
|  First round
| 1
| 
| 
| 
| 
| 
| 
| 
| 14
| 82.97
|-
|align="left"|  Royden Lam
|  First round
| 2
| 
| 
| 
| 
| 
| 
| 
| 60
| 81.43
|-
|align="left"|  Dennis Smith
|  First round
| 1
| 
| 
| 
| 
| 
| 
| 
| –
| 80.89
|-
|align="left"|  Morihiro Hashimoto
|  First round
| 2
| 
| 
| 
| 
| 
| 
| 
| 152
| 80.38
|-
|align="left"|  Max Hopp
|  First round
| 1
| 
| 
| 
| 
| 
| 
| 
| 68
| 80.17
|-
|align="left"|  Mareno Michels
|  First round
| 1
| 
| 
| 
| 
| 
| 
| 
| 136
| 79.70
|-
|align="left"|  Arron Monk
|  First round
| 1
| 
| 
| 
| 
| 
| 
| 
| 100
| 78.64
|-
|align="left"|  Matt Clark
|  First round
| 1
| 
| 
| 
| 
| 
| 
| 
| 81
| 78.50
|-
|align="left"|  Ben Ward
|  Preliminary round
| 1
| 
| 
| 
| 
| 
| 
| 
| 16
| 86.43
|-
|align="left"|  Colin McGarry
|  Preliminary round
| 1
| 
| 
| 
| 
| 
| 
| 
| 36
| 84.71
|-
|align="left"|  Mohd Latif Sapup
|  Preliminary round
| 1
| 
| 
| 
| 
| 
| 
| 
| 141
| 82.78
|-
|align="left"|  Andree Welge
|  Preliminary round
| 1
| 
| 
| 
| 
| 
| 
| 
| 91
| 79.65
|-
|align="left"|  Gino Vos
|  Preliminary round
| 1
| 
| 
| 
| 
| 
| 
| 
| 32
| 79.45
|-
|align="left"|  Ian Moss
|  Preliminary round
| 1
| 
| 
| 
| 
| 
| 
| 
| 118
| 78.63
|-
|align="left"|  Paul Lim
|  Preliminary round
| 1
| 
| 
| 
| 
| 
| 
| 
| 58
| 75.26
|-
|align="left"|  Dennis Lindskjold
|  Preliminary round
| 1
| 
| 
| 
| 
| 
| 
| 
| 2
| 74.30
|-

Representation from different countries
This table shows the number of players by country in the World Championship, the total number including the Preliminary round.

Broadcasting

The tournament was available in the following countries on these channels:

Sky Sports also showed the semi-finals and final in 3D in the United Kingdom.

References

External links
 Official site
 PDC netzone - results & schedule
 Darts at skysports.com

2014
World Championship
World Championship
2013 sports events in London
2014 sports events in London
2013 in British sport
2014 in British sport
December 2013 sports events in the United Kingdom
January 2014 sports events in the United Kingdom
International sports competitions in London
Alexandra Palace